A by-election was held for the New South Wales Legislative Assembly electorate of North Shore on 5 November 1988 because of the resignation of Ted Mack, shortly before he became entitled to a parliamentary pension.

The North Shore by-election was held the same day as the Port Stephens by-election.

Dates

Results

Ted Mack resigned.

See also
Electoral results for the district of North Shore
List of New South Wales state by-elections

Notes

References

1988 elections in Australia
New South Wales state by-elections
1980s in New South Wales